Jurij Hudolin (born 29 May 1973) is a Slovene poet, writer, columnist and translator. He has published a number of poetry collections and novels and is known for the rich language he uses and a rebellious rejectionist stance towards the world.

Hudolin was born in 1973 in Ljubljana. He grew up in Ljubljana and for a while near Pula in Istria before returning to Ljubljana to complete his secondary education and going on to study comparative literature and Serbo-Croatian at the University of Ljubljana. He published his first collection of poetry entitled Če je laž kralj (If Lies are King) in 1991 and has since published a further six poetry collections as well as three novels. His columns are regularly published in Mladina, Delo, Dnevnik, Večer and other journals and newspapers and he published a selection of them in a book in 2004 titled Pusti ti to (You Leave That Alone). His poetry has been published in many literary journals and anthologies both at home and abroad and his novels are well received amongst readers and critics alike.

After 2005, he began publishing prose and has since published seven novels and a book of short stories. In his prose, he describes mostly interpersonal relationships and life in various cities and places where he lived, from the Mediterranean to mainland Ljubljana. The author is characterized by his own syntax and rich expression. His best-known novel is Pastorek which has been translated into six languages, most recently into German as Der Stiefsohn (Septime Verlag, Wien, 2019). Hudolin's novel Ingrid Rosenfeld, nominated for the Kresnik Award in 2014, is about Jews, violence and tenderness, a picturesque vision of the world and an unwavering love of literature: this novel is a treasure trove of canons of world and Slovenian literary history. 

Hudolin's books have been translated into German, Hungarian, Czech, Croatian, English, Macedonian, Serbian and Albanian.

Published works

Poetry collections 
 Hudolin, Jurij (1991) Če je laž kralj/If Lies are King (1 st. ed.) Zagorje: Zveza kulturnih organizacij 
 
 
 Hudolin, Jurij (1993). Divjanje (1st ed.). Ljubljana: Društvo slovenskih pisateljev.

Novels

Other

References

External links
 Jurij Hudolin on Read Central, Slovenian Literature in Translation site with English excerpts from Stepchild and selected poems from Woman Speaks

Slovenian poets
Slovenian male poets
Writers from Ljubljana
Slovenian translators
Living people
1973 births
University of Ljubljana alumni